Ora Frances Porter (1880–1970) was the first registered nurse in Warren County, Kentucky, and was the first African American Butler County native to earn a college degree.

Biography 
An African American woman, she was the daughter of Sarah J. Porter, and was born in Sugar Grove, Kentucky. She moved to Bowling Green at the age of 10. Her long-time residence there was a home located between 7th and College Streets across from Cecilia Memorial Presbyterian Church.

She earned her nursing degree in Alabama at the Tuskegee University School of Nursing. By doing so, she became "the first African American Butler County native to earn a college degree."

She was also an organizer of the George Washington Carver Community Center, a local Interracial Commission after World War II.

Honors 
A historical marker in her memory was erected in Bowling Green at 715 College Street. At the dedication, 35 years after her death, the president of the Warren County Medical Society said, "We in the medical community think she is the first (registered) nurse ever in the state of Kentucky."

References 

Kentucky women in health professions
American women nurses
1880 births
1970 deaths
19th-century African-American women
African-American nurses